Marco Antonio Gentile (Genoa, 1723 - Genoa, 1798) was the 177th Doge  of the Republic of Genoa.

Biography 
During his mandate as Doge, Gentile was highly respected, as he enriched the city library, increased the botanical garden and was the first doge to visit the university. He was also a keen supporter of a more active foreign policy based on the alliance with Austria and England. After the end of his mandate, which expired on March 8, 1783, he ran again in the customs elections in 1785, but was defeated. Marco Antonio Gentile eventually died in 1798, at the age of 75, without marrying and without children.

See also 

 Republic of Genoa
 Doge of Genoa

References 

18th-century Doges of Genoa
1723 births
1798 deaths